Château Saulnier is a château in Dordogne, Nouvelle-Aquitaine, France. It became a Historic Monument in 1969.

Châteaux in Dordogne
Monuments historiques of Dordogne